The northeastern firetail skink (Morethia taeniopleura) is a species of skink found in Queensland in Australia.

References

Morethia
Reptiles described in 1874
Skinks of Australia
Endemic fauna of Australia
Taxa named by Wilhelm Peters